Francis Plowden (c.1644 – April 1712) was an English Jacobite politician, official and courtier, who rose to prominence while serving James II of England in Ireland.

Biography
Plowden born in Plowden, Shropshire to a Roman Catholic gentry family, the second son of Edmund Plowden and Elizabeth Cotton. His family had no previous connections to Ireland, but by 1688 Plowden had settled in Galway and was a member of the city's council. On 11 August 1688, he was appointed a member of the Privy Council of Ireland.

Plowden adhered to James II following the Glorious Revolution and on 27 April 1689 he was appointed to the Irish revenue commission. In May 1689 he was elected as a Member of Parliament for Bannow in the short-lived Patriot Parliament summoned by James II in Dublin. Following the death of the Earl of Tyrconnell on 14 August 1691, Plowden was appointed a Lord Justices of Ireland alongside Richard Nagle and Alexander Fitton, tasked with acting on James II's behalf while he was outside Ireland. The remaining Jacobite territory overseen by the Lords Justices was minimal, and the Williamite War in Ireland ended on 3 October 1691 with the Treaty of Limerick.

He left Ireland for France on 22 December 1691 and joined the exiled Jacobite court at Château de Saint-Germain-en-Laye. In 1695, Plowden was appointed governor to James Francis Edward Stuart, the titular Prince of Wales. In 1700, he was made comptroller of the household to James II and from 1701 held the same position for Mary of Modena. He died in April 1712 and was buried at Saint-Germain-en-Laye.

On 1 October 1699 he had married Mary, eldest daughter of Hon. John Stafford Howard and granddaughter of William Howard, 1st Viscount Stafford. Together they had a son and two daughter.

References

Year of birth uncertain
1712 deaths
17th-century English people
18th-century English people
English Jacobites
English Roman Catholics
Irish MPs 1689
Kingdom of England expatriates in France
Members of the Parliament of Ireland (pre-1801) for County Wexford constituencies
Members of the Privy Council of Ireland